Taungbon may refer to four towns and villages in Burma:

Taungbon, Sagaing in Kawlin Township
Taungbon, Mandalay in Myingyan Township
Taungbon, Shan in Ye-Ngan Township
Taungbon, Mon in Ye Township